The Peter Hansen House is a Lustron house located at 1123 E. Capitol St. in Pierre, South Dakota. Built in 1949, the house is a Westchester Deluxe model Lustron house, the most popular model of the homes. Lustron houses were steel homes built after World War II to address the housing shortage created by returning soldiers. There are two remaining Lustron houses in Pierre, including the Peter Hansen House, and 38 in South Dakota.

The house was added to the National Register of Historic Places on February 10, 1999.

References

Houses on the National Register of Historic Places in South Dakota
Houses completed in 1949
Houses in Pierre, South Dakota
Lustron houses
National Register of Historic Places in Pierre, South Dakota